Something To Say is the debut album from pop singer Joey Pearson. The album includes his debut single, "Don't Give Up", as well as a duet with actor and friend Logan O'Brien.

Track listing
 "You're Worth the Time"    
 "My Dream"    
 "Looked My Way"
 "Good Like Anything"
 "Don't Give Up"
 "Younger Generation" (featuring Logan O'Brien)
 "Candle Light the Way"
 "I'll Be Your Friend"
 "I Know What Love Is"
 "Once in a Lifetime"

2002 debut albums
Joey Pearson albums